Circolo Canottieri Napoli (in English:Naples Rowing Club) is one of the most prestigious and renowned Italian nautical clubs. Founded in 1914, its headquarters are located in the green oasis gardens of "Molosiglio", in San Ferdinando overlooking the bay of Naples. With more than a thousand members in its ranks, hosts several Olympic disciplines like boating, powerboat, swimming, water polo, tennis, triathlon and more. Their home court is in downtown Naples housed in the municipal swimming pool on Ulisse Prota Giurleo street.

The headquarters 
The club's headquarters is at the southwest corner of the gardens of Molosiglio in an area near Acton street, which includes the namesake port. With an area of 7000 sq.m. and 3500 sq.m. covered structures, it is one of the largest sailing clubs in Naples. The marina offers mooring for approximately 150 boats and is the basis for the section speedboats and boating. The locker rooms, swimming pools and gyms of the Rowing Club are located on the ground floor, while the terraces and lounges on the first floor are home to cultural events and gatherings.  Other sporting activities revolve around the two pools, one small for the children, 33 meters, is consistent with FINA to play polo. Another pool club located in Ponticelli Via Ulisse Prota Giurleo, 3. In addition, the club has two tennis courts.

Sports activities 
Canottieri Napoli organizes and participates in many sports events at the national and international level, with many sports teams.

The men's water polo team competes in Italy's Serie A2 (men's water polo).

The teams participating in swimming and rowing, with good results, for the Italian league and continue to provide athletes for national teams.

The club has organized a race with boats in force for the period of the Italian Championship in 2012 for the category Offshore 3000. The fight took place on 2 and 3 June in the water in front of the promenade cttadino. La gara si è disputata il 2 e il 3 giugno nello specchio d'acqua antistante il lungomare cttadino.

Circolo Canottieri Napoli also organizes many races. This sport has a momentum of the game in the World Series Naples 2012 - 2013 brought America's Cup.

The triathlon is the latest sport practised in Canottieri Napoli.

Water polo team 
Canottieri Napoli's water polo team is one of the most important and successful in Italy and Europe. In the TROPHY includes several national championships and cups but over the diamond in the crown is the 1978 European Championship.

Palmarès

European competitions
 LEN Champions League
 Winners (1): 1977-78
 Runners-up (1): 1990-91
 F4 3rd place (1): 1975-76
 F4 4th place (1): 1973-74
 LEN Super Cup
 Runners-up (1): 1978

Domestic competitions
 Italian League
 Winners (8): 1950-51, 1957–58, 1962–63, 1972–73, 1974–75, 1976–77, 1978–79, 1989-90
 Italian Cup
 Winners (1): 1969-70

References

Water polo clubs in Italy
Sports clubs established in 1914
Sport in Naples
Rowing in Italy